This is a list of animated feature films that were released in 2019.

Highest-grossing animated films
The following is a list of the 10 highest-grossing animated feature films first released in 2019.

In June, Toy Story 4 set the record for the biggest opening for an animated film, with $244.5 million. However, the record was surpassed by The Lion King the following month, which grossed $246 million. The latter then become the fastest animated film to gross $1 billion worldwide doing so in 21 days, surpassing Incredibles 2 (46 days), and on August 11, it surpassed Frozen to become the highest-grossing animated film of all time in only 31 days. Ne Zha is currently the highest-grossing fully Chinese produced animated film of all time. Frozen II set the record as the biggest opening weekend for an animated with $350.2 million worldwide. 2019 is the first year when 3 animated films surpassed $1 billion.

Notes

References

 Feature films
2019
2019-related lists